Has It Leaked is a Swedish music community and online magazine. It has been mentioned and noted on websites such as The Guardian, Wired.com, TorrentFreak, and Uproxx.

Reception 
An article by  published on Noisey refers to Has It Leaked as being like the Neighborhood Watch of musical leaks.

References

External links
 

2012 establishments in Sweden
Magazines established in 2012
Mass media in Gothenburg
Online music magazines
Swedish-language magazines
Swedish music websites